Shahrak-e Shahid Beheshti may refer to:
 Shahrak-e Shahid Beheshti, Fars
 Shahrak-e Shahid Beheshti, Dezful, Khuzestan Province
 Shahrak-e Shahid Beheshti, Shushtar, Khuzestan Province
 Shahrak-e Shahid Beheshti, Razavi Khorasan
 Shahrak-e Shahid Beheshti, Bampur, Sistan and Baluchestan Province
 Shahrak-e Shahid Beheshti, Hirmand, Sistan and Baluchestan Province